Friedensbrücke  is a station on  of the Vienna U-Bahn. It is in the Alsergrund District. It opened in 1976.

References

Buildings and structures in Alsergrund
Railway stations opened in 1976
Vienna U-Bahn stations
1976 establishments in Austria
Railway stations in Austria opened in the 20th century